HMHS Garth Castle was a hospital ship which served with the Royal Navy during the First World War. Built in 1910 as a passenger liner for the Union-Castle Line, she was commissioned as a hospital ship on 4 November 1914, with a capacity of roughly 250 casualties. The ship took part in the North Russia Intervention in 1918–19.

She was returned to her owners in 1919 and broken up at Blyth, Northumberland in 1939.

See also
List of hospitals and hospital ships of the Royal Navy

References

1910 ships
Hospital ships in World War I
Ships of the Royal Navy